An election for Limerick Municipal Council was held in 1899 as part of the wider 1899 Irish local elections. Following the reforms of the 1898 Act Limerick's franchise had increased from 709 to 5,521.

A total of 79 candidates contested the 40 seats; with 27 of the outgoing councillors putting themselves forward for re-election, 34 Laborites putting themselves forward, 18 Merchants and large rate-payers.

The election saw Labour winning control of the council, with 24 of the councils 40 seats. Hand in hand with Labor's victory, went the victory of the Irish Republican Brotherhood. Of the 40 councillors, 21 were members of the IRB. Of these 21 IRB members, 18 were Laborites.

Aggregate results

The result had the following consequences for the total number of seats on the council after the elections:

Ward results

References

1899 Irish local elections
1899
1899 in Irish politics